Gustavo Almeida dos Santos simply known as Gustavo (born 25 July 1996) is a Brazilian professional footballer who plays as a forward.

Club Career 
In 2022 he joined the team Negeri Sembilan FC on a free transfer. Has been with the team for half a years and has become a key player throughout 2022. He has helped the team secure fourth place in the Malaysia Super League in 2022. It is an impressive achievement as the team has just been promoted from the Malaysia Premier League in the previous year and had shocked the other Malaysia Super League teams as Negeri Sembilan FC was considered an underdog team. He has made 13 appearances and scored 11 goals during his time with Negeri Sembilan FC. He was top scorer for Negeri Sembilan FC in 2022.

References

External links

1996 births
Living people
Association football forwards
Brazilian expatriate footballers
Brazilian expatriate sportspeople in Vietnam
Brazilian expatriate sportspeople in Malaysia
Brazilian expatriate sportspeople in Japan
Brazilian footballers
Expatriate footballers in Malaysia
Expatriate footballers in Japan
UiTM FC players
Esporte Clube Primeiro Passo Vitória da Conquista players
Negeri Sembilan FC players
Footballers from São Paulo